Makur Maker (born 4 November 2000) is a South Sudanese-Australian professional basketball player for the Capital City Go-Go of the NBA G League. A consensus five-star recruit, he committed to play college basketball for Howard University, becoming the highest-ranked player in the modern recruiting era to commit to a historically black college or university (HBCU).

Born in Nairobi, Maker grew up in Perth, Western Australia, before playing high school basketball in North America. He is the cousin of basketball players Thon and Matur Maker.

Early life
Maker was born in Nairobi, Kenya, to South Sudanese parents and immigrated to Perth, Western Australia, when he was one year old. Before focusing on basketball, he mainly took interest in football as a striker and often played beach soccer with his friends. Maker played for Quinns Football club alongside his older brothers. Maker attended St. Andrews Catholic Primary School and joined Irene McCormack Catholic College for high school. He was drawn to basketball in part because of his exceptional height.

High school career
In 2015, Maker moved to the United States and enrolled for his freshman year at Chaminade College Preparatory School in West Hills, Los Angeles. As a result, he was forced to live away from his family for many years. As a freshman, Maker averaged 9.5 points, 8.2 rebounds and 2.5 blocks per game.
In 2016, he transferred to The Tech Academy, a prep school in Sault Ste. Marie, Ontario. He was drawn to the program by his cousins, basketball players Thon and Matur Maker. His cousins also brought him under the guidance of Ed Smith, a coach who had helped direct them through their own basketball careers. Maker joined the basketball team with Matur and played in the National Preparatory Association and The Grind Session. In his next year, The Tech Academy closed and he was homeschooled. Maker suffered a foot injury that sidelined him for the 2017–18 season. 

In the summer of 2018, he transferred to Orange Lutheran High School in Orange, California. As a junior, he earned All-Trinity League first team and Orange County Register All-County second team honors. Maker faced eligibility questions entering his senior season, because he had already exhausted his eight semesters of eligibility. Instead of seeking a waiver from the California Interscholastic Federation to continue playing for Orange Lutheran, he transferred to Pacific Academy, a prep school in Irvine, California, and continued his career with the affiliated program, Center of International Basketball Academy. On 17 October 2019, it was announced that he had submitted paperwork to explore his eligibility for the 2020 NBA draft. On 25 April 2020, he declared for the 2020 NBA draft. Despite finishing two credits short of high school graduation, Maker was granted eligibility by the NBA. However, on 3 August he withdrew from the draft to play college basketball.

Recruiting
Maker was a consensus five-star recruit and one of the top centers in the 2020 recruiting class, according to major recruiting services. On 3 July 2020, he committed to play college basketball for Howard over offers from UCLA, Kentucky and Memphis. He became the highest-ranked recruit to commit to a historically black college or university (HBCU) in the modern recruiting era. Maker made the decision in part to encourage future prospects to play for HBCU programs.

College career
After playing in Howard's first two games, Maker was ruled out indefinitely on 28 November 2020, due to a groin injury suffered in preseason practice.

Professional career

Sydney Kings (2021–2022)
On 21 August 2021, Maker signed with the Sydney Kings of the National Basketball League (NBL) on a Next Stars contract.

After going undrafted in the 2022 NBA draft, Maker joined the Chicago Bulls for the 2022 NBA Summer League.

Capital City Go-Go (2022–present)
On August 10, 2022, Maker signed an Exhibit 10 contract with the Washington Wizards. He was then later waived on October 12, 2022. On November 4, 2022, Maker was named to the opening night roster for the Capital City Go-Go.

National team career
In February 2019, Maker stated that he would play for Australia internationally. He made himself available to represent Australia at the 2019 FIBA Under-19 Basketball World Cup but was not selected in the final squad.

Career statistics

College

|-
| style="text-align:left;"| 2020–21
| style="text-align:left;"| Howard
| 2 || 2 || 24.0 || .500 || .000 || .900 || 6.0 || 2.0 || .0 || 1.0 || 11.5

Personal life
Maker is a cousin of basketball players Thon Maker and Matur Maker. Makur is also a cousin of Aliir Aliir who plays for Port Adelaide in the Australian Football League. He has six brothers and one sister. Maker descends from the Dinka people in South Sudan. His guardian is Liberian-born basketball coach Ed Smith, who is the same guardian as his cousins Thon and Matur.

References

External links
NBL profile
Howard Bison bio

2000 births
Living people
Australian expatriate basketball people in the United States
Australian men's basketball players
Basketball people from Nairobi
Basketball players from Perth, Western Australia
Centers (basketball)
Dinka people
Howard Bison men's basketball players
South Sudanese emigrants to Australia
South Sudanese men's basketball players
Sydney Kings players